The Diocesan Shrine and Parish of Our Lady of Light, popularly known as Cainta Church (Spanish: Parroquia de Nuestra Señora de Lumen), is a Roman Catholic parish church located along Andres Bonifacio Avenue in Barangay San Andres, Cainta, Rizal, in the Philippines. The church also operates a neighboring school, Cainta Catholic College. From its time of erection as a parish in 1760 until 1983, it belonged to the Archdiocese of Manila. It was placed under the newly created Diocese of Antipolo in 1983, which is now headed by Francisco M. De Leon. It belongs to the Vicariate of Our Lady of Light.

On 6 December 2017, Pope Francis granted the papal bull of canonical coronation towards its enshrined Marian image and it was crowned on 1 December 2018. The venerated image is a destroyed Sicilian painting from 1727, recreated by Philippine national artist Fernando Amorsolo due to the burning of the original relic during the Filipino-American war in 1899. It is the first Marian image in Philippine history to be pontifically crowned as an artistic painting. On the same day as its canonical coronation, the parish church was consecrated and elevated into a Diocesan Shrine.

History
The original church of Cainta was first constructed in stone by Father Gaspar Marco, a Jesuit priest, in 1707. The shrine at the time was under the patronage of Saint Andrew the Apostle. The construction of the stone church was designed by Father Juan de Salazar, S.J., and was completed during the time of Joaquin Sanchez, S.J., in 1716 while he was still the parish priest.

In 1727, a painting of Our Lady of Light was brought in from the Kingdom of Sicily and was chosen as the new patroness of the church. By 1760, the church was officially declared a separate parish.

On 23 February 1853, an earthquake damaged the church building. Both its roof and one wall collapsed while the walls of the parish rectory or convent sustained cracks.

By 1884 the parish had been named Our Lady of Light (Virgen ng Caliuanagan or Madre Santissima del Lumen in Tagalog and Spanish languages), as attested in the 5 August 1884 letter by the pastor of Cainta Don Mariano de San Juan to the Archbishop of Manila, Fray Pedro Payo, O.P.

Filipino-American War
During the Filipino-American War in March 1899, the church and parish rectory of Cainta were burned down including the venerated Marian image within. Stones from the church walls were later used to build roads. The only mark left of its Jesuit beginning was attached at the top portion of the church's façade – the monogram of the Holy Name of Jesus "IHS" (Latin: Iesus Hominum Salvator). The church was left in ruins for 67 years without any significant restoration.

Reconstruction

By the mid-1960s, Archbishop of Manila Rufino Cardinal Santos instructed the director of the National Museum of the Philippines, Galo Ocampo, to study the possibility of reconstructing the church on its original site. On 15 February 1965, the Cardinal gave permission for the church's reconstruction, which began on 10 June 1966. The facade was kept untouched.

The reconstruction was halted when one of the beams collapsed. Further study was conducted to determine if it could withstand earthquakes. The reconstruction resumed on 15 June 1967 and completed after one year.
 
Filipino National Artist Fernando Amorsolo was commissioned to create a replica of the icon of the Blessed Virgin Mary. Devotees today consider Amorsolo's replica the Philippine version of the original painting of Our Lady of Light in Palermo, Italy. The restoration and reconstruction of the parish was completed and was blessed by Rufino Cardinal Santos on 25 February 1968.

In 1975, the administration of the parish was turned over by the CICM Missionaries to the Archdiocese of Manila, with Monsignor Alfredo Santa Ana, HP, as its first diocesan parish priest.

The church was the sole parish in the entire municipality of Cainta until 1998, when the community of Brookside Subdivision was granted a parish, Sacred Heart of Jesus. In 2002, three new independent parishes were erected in villages along Imelda Avenue. Parts of Barangay San Andres were later given to newly established parishes, namely San Andres Apostol in Greenwoods Executive Village (2009) and Saint Francis of Assisi in Cambridge, Floodway (2011). More parishes were canonically established: the Parish of St. Joseph the Worker (2015) in Greenland, and recently St. Oscar Romero Quasi-Parish (2019) in Marick Subdivision.

In 2007, the Cainta Church was declared a historical site by the National Historical Institute (NHI) – now the National Historical Commission of the Philippines (NHCP) – for its significant role during the Philippines-American War. On 1 December that year, the newly renovated altar and the new historical marker of the church were blessed. An episcopal coronation was held on 1 December 2012 coinciding with the parish fiesta, and performed by the local bishop with the assistance of former ambassador to the Vatican, Ms. Henrietta De Villa.

Architectural features

The original church, including the sacristy and rectory, was made of stone and limestone (calycanto) while the roof was tiled. It had a dome (media naranja), transepts (crucero), and five buttresses (contrafuertos). The nave's spacious presbytery had windows and skylight (claraboya). The belfry had four bells, two of which were small bells rung by rotation (esquitas). The baptistery with an arched ceiling was situated at the bottom of the belfry. Flooring was made of wood. It also had a choir loft, communion rail, pulpit and three doors. Five retablos were found inside the church. The original picture of the Our Lady of Light was enshrined at the central niche.

The rectory had a kitchen, two brick chimneys, four rooms and offices.

It has a main door and four lateral doors. There are separate chapels for the Blessed Sacrament and for Our Lady of Light and Saint Andrew, both enshrined at the sides of the sanctuary. The bell tower, which is attached to the church building, has arched windows.

Marian image

The devotion to Our Lady of Light was introduced in Cainta in 1727. The original picture brought by the Jesuits had a gilded frame and crest and was enshrined in one of the side altars (colacerales). It was transferred to the main altar (retablo mayor) before 1853. Two faithful copies of the original picture exist. The first was an 1801 print given to those who gave donations to the Virgin Mary with bottom inscription:

The second faithful copy is a charcoal painting by Mariano Javier of Cainta, painted in 1857. Presently, it is under the care of the family of the late Flora Javier-Buenviaje.

The present painting of the Our Lady of Light was painted using oil on canvas by the renowned National Artist Fernando Amorsolo. Over time, the painting had developed some discolorations and acquired dirt and insect excrement. Specialists were consulted who recommended conservation. Conservation procedures were done in four months by Carmina Silverio, a conservator and restorer of painting and sculptures.

The feast day of the venerated image is celebrated annually on December 1, after the feast of Saint Andrew. Her secondary feast is observed on Thursday after Pentecost Sunday.

Clergy

Gallery

See also
Roman Catholic Diocese of Antipolo
John Paul II Minor Seminary
Nuestra Señora de la Luz (disambiguation)
Our Lady of Light (disambiguation)
Our Lady of Zeitoun
Diocesan Shrine and Parish of St. Joseph

References

Other sources 
The Official Website of the Municipality of Cainta
The Roman Catholic Diocese of Antipolo
Cainta Catholic College
"Our Lady of Light", The Marian Library/International Marian Research Institute, University of Dayton.

External links

 Diocesan Shrine and Parish of Our Lady of Light on Facebook

Roman Catholic churches in Rizal
Buildings and structures in Cainta
Roman Catholic shrines in the Philippines
Shrines to the Virgin Mary
Churches in the Roman Catholic Diocese of Antipolo